Griffin (Griffith) Curteys or Curtis (by 1521 – 30 November 1587), of Bradenstoke, Wiltshire, was an English estate steward, notably to Sir Henry Long, and member of parliament.

He was a Member (MP) of the Parliament of England for Calne in 1547, Westbury in October 1553, April 1554 and November 1554, Malmesbury in 1558 and Ludgershall in 1563.

References

1587 deaths
Year of birth uncertain
People from Wiltshire
English MPs 1547–1552
English MPs 1553 (Mary I)
English MPs 1554
English MPs 1554–1555
English MPs 1558
English MPs 1563–1567
Members of the Parliament of England for constituencies in Wiltshire